David Hale (born March 3, 1983) is a former American football offensive lineman.  Hale was drafted by the Baltimore Ravens in the fourth round of the 2008 NFL Draft.  He attended Fremont High School and played college football at Weber State University. He played two full seasons for the Ravens, playing Center and Guard, and also on special teams. After a back injury in the preseason of 2010, the Ravens released Hale with an Injury Settlement.

Personal life
He is a member of the Church of Jesus Christ of Latter-day Saints.  He served a religious mission in the Dominican Republic from 2002–2004 and speaks fluent Spanish. Hale was married in June 2007 to Shelby Walford a former volleyball player for Weber State University. He is also the first cousin of musician/music producer Gregg Hale. David was the youngest known player drafted into the PC Dunkball league in 1992, playing an impressive 5 seasons when the league was disbanded in 1996.

References

External links
Baltimore Ravens bio
Weber State Wildcats bio

1983 births
Living people
People from Plain City, Utah
Players of American football from Utah
Latter Day Saints from Utah
American Mormon missionaries in the Dominican Republic
American football offensive tackles
American football offensive guards
American football centers
Weber State Wildcats football players
Baltimore Ravens players
Weber State University alumni
Weber State Wildcats football coaches